Randall C. Brogdon (born June 17, 1953) is an American businessman and politician from the state of Oklahoma. He was a state senator for Oklahoma's 34th senate district from 2002 until 2011. Brogdon ran for governor of Oklahoma in 2010 on a platform of tax cuts and reducing the role of government. He was defeated by Mary Fallin. On December 25, 2013, Brogdon announced that he would challenge incumbent Governor Fallin in the 2014 gubernatorial election. However, he withdrew to run for the U.S. Senate in a special election triggered by the retirement of Tom Coburn. He lost the nomination to representative James Lankford. In April 2015, he was elected as chairman of the Oklahoma Republican Party.

Brogdon was born in Ardmore, Oklahoma. He graduated from Tulsa High School and studied air conditioning at Oklahoma State University in Okmulgee, Oklahoma. He went on to own a mechanical contracting company and an air conditioning business.

Political career
Brogdon was elected to his first term in the Oklahoma Senate in 2002. His district includes large portions of the Tulsa suburban area, including Owasso, Collinsville, Catoosa, Sperry and the fast-growing areas of northeast Tulsa County and Rogers County.

He started his political career by serving on the Owasso City Council and was later elected as mayor. In a three-way primary he defeated the incumbent mayor and a third candidate by an absolute majority, avoiding a runoff.

While in the state Senate, Brogdon was honored by the Oklahoma Conservative Political Action Committee. For the 2005-2006 legislative session, he was elected to a leadership position by his caucus to serve as Senate Republican Whip and in 2007-2008 he served as the Assistant Republican Floor Leader. In 2007, he was the recipient of the Phyllis Schlafly Oklahoma Eagle Award. In 2008, he was appointed as chairman of Appropriation of Transportation and General Government sub-committee.

On April 18, 2009, Brogdon announced his candidacy for Oklahoma Governor in the 2010 election. During his campaign, he called for the establishment of a state militia to defend Oklahoma from the federal government. He was defeated in his bid for the Republican nomination by Congresswoman Mary Fallin. Fallin received 55% of the vote and Brogdon 39%.

In 2011, Brogdon joined the Oklahoma Department of Insurance after being appointed by Insurance Commissioner John D. Doak as Deputy Commissioner of Fraud and Investigations Unit. This appointment caused some initial controversy after his appointment was challenged as unconstitutional; however, the Oklahoma Attorney General in years past has issued opinions that defend appointments similar to Brogdon's.

In April 2015, Brogdon was elected as state party chairman for the Oklahoma Republican Party, defeating incumbent Dave Weston and OFRW President, Pam Pollard. In July of that year, he wrote a sarcastic post on Facebook in reference to Oklahoma's food stamp policy, stating that "the National Park Service, administered by the U.S. Department of the Interior, asks us ‘Please Do Not Feed the Animals.’ Their stated reason for the policy is because ‘The animals will grow dependent on handouts and will not learn to take care of themselves.’ Thus ends today’s lesson in irony ?#?OKGOP?" After a backlash from Oklahoman Democrats, Brogdon apologized for his post, adding that he still believed it was "important to have conversations about government welfare programs... our dependency on government is at its highest level ever."

In September 2015 Brogdon resigned as Chairman of the Oklahoma Republican Party.

Senate Committees
2009-2010
Appropriations
Appropriations Subcommittee on General Government and Transportation - Chair
Business and Labor
Energy and Environment - Vice Chair
Transportation

2007-2008
Appropriations
Appropriations Subcommittee on General Government and Transportation - Co-Chair
Business and Labor
Energy and Environment
Transportation

2005-2006
Appropriations
Appropriations Subcommittee on Education
Business and Labor
Energy and Environment
Retirement and Group Health
Transportation

2003-2004
Agriculture and Rural Development
Appropriations
Appropriations Subcommittee on Human Services
Business and Labor
Tourism and Wildlife
Transportation

Election results

References

External links
 
 
 
 Map of Oklahoma Senate District 34

1953 births
Living people
Mayors of places in Oklahoma
Oklahoma State University alumni
Republican Party Oklahoma state senators
People from Ardmore, Oklahoma
People from Owasso, Oklahoma
21st-century American politicians
Candidates in the 2010 United States elections
Candidates in the 2014 United States elections
Oklahoma city council members